The Fauna of British India (short title) with long titles including The Fauna of British India, Including Ceylon and Burma, and The Fauna of British India Including the Remainder of the Oriental Region is a series of scientific books that was published by the British government in India and printed by Taylor and Francis of London. The series was started sometime in 1881 after a letter had been sent to the Secretary of State for India signed by Charles Darwin, Sir Joseph Dalton Hooker and other "eminent men of science" forwarded by P.L.Sclater to R.H. Hobart. W. T. Blanford was appointed editor and began work on the volume on mammals.

In the volume on the mammals, Blanford notes:

The idea was to cover initially the vertebrates, taking seven volumes, and this was followed by a proposal to cover the invertebrates in about 15 to 20 volumes and projected to cost £11,250 to £15,000. Blanford suggested that restricting it to 14 volumes would make it possible to limit the cost to £10,500.  After Blanford's death, Arthur Everett Shipley became the editor. The first series was followed by a second edition of some of the volumes such as the mammals, birds, reptiles and butterflies.  In 1922-23, Nelson Annandale sought to move the process of preparation of the books and its publication to India. The second edition is sometimes called the "new fauna". There were changes incorporated in this that included for instance the usage of trinomials for the birds. Following Shipley's death in 1927, Lieutenant Colonel John Stephenson, formerly of the Indian Medical Service was appointed editor in May 1928. Publication was stopped during the Second World War. After Indian Independence in 1947 a few volumes were published under the new name of Fauna of India but some of the volumes that were under preparation were never published. The 1953 volume on polychaetes by Pierre Fauvel was published by the Indian Press from Allahabad.

Protozoa

 Bhatia, B. L. (1936) Vol. I Protozoa:Ciliophora
 Bhatia, B. L. (1938) Vol. II Protozoa: Sporozoa

Coelenterata
 Annandale, Nelson (1911) Freshwater sponges, Hydroids & Polyzoa [251 p - 48 figs - 5 pl ]  
 Burton M (?) Porifera (Not published)

Nematoda, Cestoda, Oligochaeta, Annelida etc.
 Stephenson, J. (1923) Oligochaeta xxiv + 518 p - 261 figs
 Harding, W. A. & John Percy Moore (1927) Hirudinea xxxviii + 302 p - 63 figs - 8 pl (4 col.) - 1 map 
 Southwell, T. (1930) Cestoda. Volume 1. Cestodaria, Bucestoda (excl. Taenioidia) 
 Southwell, T. (1930) Cestoda. Volume 2. Taenioidia
 Baylis, H. A. (1936) Nematoda. 1. Ascaroidea and Strongyloidea [408 p - 182 figs ]
 Baylis, H. A. (1939) Nematoda. 2. Filarioidea, Dioctophymoidea and Trichinelloidea [274 p - 150 figs ]
 Fauvel, Pierre (1953) Polychaeta
 Bhalerao, DG (?) Trematoda (this was announced but never published)

Crustacea
Although these volumes were sanctioned, they were never published.
 Nilsson-Cantell, CA (?) Cirripedia
 Chopra BN (?) Brachyura (Oxyrhyncha)
 Seymour Sewell, RB (?) Copepoda (Calanoids)

Echinodermata
 Mortensen, Theodor Echinoidea (This was never produced due to the death of the author. See preface by R B Seymour Sewell in the 1953 Polychaeta volume.)

Mollusca
 Blanford W. T. & Godwin-Austen H. H. 1908. Mollusca. Testacellidae and Zonitidae. Taylor & Francis, London. 311 pp.
 Gude G. K. 1914. Mollusca.−II. (Trochomorphidae--Janellidae). xii + 520 pp., 164 figs.
 Gude G. K. 1921. Mollusca.−III. Land operculates (Cyclophoridae, Truncatellidae, Assimineidae, Helicinidae). 386 pp.
 Preston H B 1915. Mollusca. Freshwater Gastropoda & Pelecypoda. Taylor & Francis, London, 244 pp., 29 figs.
 Prashad, Baini (?) Mollusca 5. Pelecypoda (not published)

Arachnida
 Pocock, R.I. (1900) Arachnida (Split PDF)
 Sharif M (?) Ticks.

Hemiptera
 Distant, W.L. (1902) Rhynchota 1. Heteroptera. Pentatomidae, Coreidae, Berytidae (See also Index to Rhynchota)
 Distant, W.L. (1904) Rhynchota 2. Heteroptera. Family 4 to 16. (Lygaeidae - Capsidae) 
 Distant, W.L. (1906) Rhynchota 3. Heteroptera - Homoptera Heteroptera-family 17 to 24. (Anthoceridae - Coricidae) / Cicadidae, Fulgoridae. 
 Distant, W.L. (1907-8) Rhynchota 4. Homoptera: Membracidae, Cercopidae, Jassidae & Heteroptera: Appendix  (initially published in two parts)
 Distant, W.L. (1911) Rhynchota 5. Heteroptera: Appendix 
 Distant, W.L. (1916) Rhynchota 6. Homoptera. Appendix 
 Distant, W.L. (1918) Rhynchota 7. Homoptera:Appendix to Jassidae, Heteroptera:Addenda

Dermaptera
 Burr, M. (1910) Dermaptera (Earwigs) [217 p - 10 pl]

Odonata
 Fraser, F.C. (1933) Odonata. 1 Introduction, Coenagriidae 423 p
 Fraser, F.C. (1934) Odonata. 2 Agriidae, Gomphidae 398 p - 120 figs - 4 col. pl.
 Fraser, F.C. (1936) Odonata. 3 Cordulegasteridae, Aeshnidae, Libellulidae. 461 p.

Orthoptera
 Kirby, WF (1914) Acridiidae
Second edition
 Uvarov, BP (?) Acridiidae
 Chopard L. (1969) The Fauna of India and the Adjacent Countries. Orthoptera. Vol.2: Grylloidea. Calcutta: Baptist Mission Press.
 Henry G M (?) Tettigoniidae

Blattaria
 Shelford, R. Blattidae (sanctioned but not published)

Coleoptera

 Andrewes, H. (1929) Carabidae 1. Carabinae [ 431 p - 62 figs - 9 pl (1 col) ]
 Andrewes, H. (1935) Carabidae 2. Harpalinae [ 323 p - 51 figs - 5 pl ]
 Arrow, G.J. (1910) Lamellicornia 1. Cetoniinae and Dynastinae [xiv + 322 p - 76 figs - 2 col. pl. ]
 Arrow, G.J. (1917) Lamellicornia 2. Rutelinae, Desmonycinae, Euchirinae  [xiii + 387 p - 77 figs - 5 pl (1 col.)]
 Arrow, G.J. (1931) Lamellicornia 3. Coprinae [428 p - 61 figs - 13 pl (1 col.) - 1 map ]
 Arrow, G.J. (1949) Lamellicornia 4. Lucanidae & Passalidae[vii + 274 pp., 23 pl]
 Arrow, G.J. (1925) Clavicornia : Erotylidae, Languriidae & Endomychidae [xv + 416 p - 76 figs - 1 col. pl. - 1 map]
 Beeson, C.F.C. (?) Platypodidae
 Browne, J Balfour (never published) Dytiscidae, Gyrinidae and Haliplidae 
 Cameron, M. (1930) Staphylinidae 1. (Micropeplinae, Oxytelinae, Oxyporinae, Megalopinae, Steninae, Enaesthetinae) [471 p - 134 figs - 1 map - 3 col. plates] 
 Cameron, M. (1934) Staphylinidae. 2. (Paederinae) 257 p - 2 col. pl. 
 Cameron, M. (1932) Staphylinidae 3. (Staphylininae, Trichophyinae, Termitodiscinae, Pygosteninae, Tachyporinae) 443 p - 4 col. pl. 
 Cameron, M. (1939) Staphylinidae 4. Part 1. Subfam. Pseudopernthinae and Aleocharinae (part)
 Cameron, M. (1939) Staphylindae 4. Part 2. Aleocharinae.
 Fowler, W. (1912) Coleoptera. General introduction and Cicindelidae to Paussidae xx + 529 p - 240 figs
 Gahan, C. (1906) Coleoptera. Cerambycidae 329 p -107 figs
 Jacoby, Martin & others (1908-1936) Chrysomelidae Volumes 1-4. (Jacoby died before the first volume was published. See preface to the first volume by C T Bingham) 
 Jacoby, M. (1908)  Chrysomelidae 1. Eupodes, Camptosomes, Cyclica 534 p - 172 figs - 2 pl 
 Maulik, S. (1919) Chrysomelidae Volume 2 Hispinae and Cassidinae xi + 439 p - 130 figs 
 Maulik, S. (1926) Chrysomelidae Volume 3. Chrysomelinae and Halticinae 442 p - 139 figs - 1 map 
 Maulik, S.(1936) Chrysomelidae Volume 4. Galerucinae 648 p - 144 fig - 1 map - 1 pl - hbk 
Marshall, Guy A.K. (1916) Rhynchophora, Curculionidae 367 p - 108 figs
Sanctioned but not published
 Beeson CFC Scolytidae 
 Beeson CFC Platypodidae 
 Stebbing, E.P. Buprestidae

Diptera
 Brunetti, E. (1912) Diptera : Nematocera excluding Chironomidae &  Culicidae 581 p
 Brunetti, E. (1920) Diptera 2. Brachycera Volume 1 (Stratiomyiidae, Leptidae, Nemestinidae, Cyrtidae, Bombyliidae, Therevidae, Scenopinidae, Mydaidae, Empidae, Lonchopteridae, Platypezidae) 401 p.
 Brunetti, E. (1923) Diptera 3. Pipunculidae, Syrphidae, Conopidae, Oestridae [424 p - 83 fig - 5 pl]
 Christophers, S.R. (1933) Diptera Volume 4. Culicidae tribe Anophelini
 Barraud, P.J. (1934) Diptera Volume 5.  (Culicidae) tribes Megarhinini & Culicini
 R Senior-White, Daphne Aubertin & John Smart (1940) Diptera Volume 6. Calliphoridae
 Hobby, BM (?) Diptera Volume 7. Asilidae
 Oldroyd, H (?) Tabanidae
 van Emden, F I - Muscidae Diptera Volume 7. Part 1 Published 1966 in The Fauna of India - Part 2 was planned but never published.

Aphaniptera
 Sharif, M (?) Fleas.

Hymenoptera

 Bingham, C.T. (1897) Hymenoptera. Vol. 1. Wasps and bees xxix + 579 pp.
 Bingham, C. T. (1903) Hymenoptera, Vol. 2. Ants and Cuckoo-wasps 506 pp. 
 Morley, C. (1913) Hymenoptera Vol. 3. Ichneumones Deltoidei 531 p - 152 fig - 1 pl

Lepidoptera
 Bingham, C. T. (1905) Butterflies Vol. 1 - Family Nymphalidae
 Bingham, C. T. (1907) Butterflies Vol. 2 - Families Papilionidae, Pieridae and Lycaenidae
 George Francis Hampson & others (1892-1937) Moths. 5 volumes
 Hampson, G. (1892) Moths 1. Saturniidae to Hypsidae 527 p - 333 fig 
 Hampson, G. (1894) Moths 2. Arctiidae, Agrostidae, Noctuidae 609 p - 325 figs
 Hampson, G. (1895) Moths 3. Noctuidae (cont.) to Geometridae  546 p - 226 figs
 Hampson, G. (1896) Moths 4. Pyralidae 594 p - 287 figs
 Bell TRD & F B Scott (1937) Moths. Vol. 5. Sphingidae [537 p - 1 folding map - 15 pl]

Second edition
 Talbot, G. (1939) Butterflies. Vol. 1 Papilionidae, Pieridae, xxix + 600 p - 184 figs - 1 folding map - 3 col. pl. 
 Talbot, G. (1947) Butterflies. Vol. 2 Danaidae, Satyridae, Amathusiidae and Acraeidae. xv + 506 p - 104 figs - 2 col. pl.

Reptilia and Amphibia
 Günther, A.C.L.G. (1864) Reptiles of British India . xxvii + 452 p - 26 pl (Not part of the Fauna of British India series, but included here for completeness)
 Boulenger, G. A. (1890) Reptilia and Batrachia xviii + 541 p - 142 figs
Second edition
 Smith, M. A. (1931-1943) Reptilia and Amphibia. 3 Volumes. (Volume 4 was to cover Amphibia).
 Smith, M. A. (1931) Reptilia and Amphibia 1: Loricata and Testudines  xviii + 185 p - 42 figs - 2 pl 
 Smith, M. A. (1935) Reptilia and Amphibia 2: Sauria  xiii + 440 p - 93 figs - 1 pl - 2 maps
 Smith, M. A. (1943) Reptilia and Amphibia 3: Serpentes xii + 583 p - 166 figs

Fishes
 Day, Francis (July 11, 1889) Fishes Volume I Chondropterygii, Teleoste (Physostomi; Acanthopterygii: Percidae)
 Day, Francis (September 21, 1889) Fishes Volume II Teleostei (Acanthopterygii excl. Percidae; Anacanthini; Lophobranchii; Plectognathi), Leptocardii
Second edition
 Hora, SL (?) (projected to be published in 5 volumes in 1953 but not published)

Birds

Oates, E. W. (Blanford, W. T., editor) (1889) Birds. 1 [582 p]
 Oates, E. W. (1890) Birds. 2 [424 p]
 Blanford, W. T. (1895) Birds. 3 [450 p - 102 figs] 
 Blanford, W. T. (1898) Birds. 4 [500 p - 127 figs]

Second edition
 Baker, Stuart (1922) Birds. 1 524 p
 Baker, Stuart (1924) Birds. 2 606 p - 86 figs
 Baker, Stuart (1926) Birds. 3 534 p
 Baker, Stuart (1927) Birds. 4 471 p - 71 figs
 Baker, Stuart (1928) Birds. 5 469 p - 49 figs
 Baker, Stuart (1929) Birds. 6 548 p
 Baker, Stuart (1930) Birds. 7 484 p (Synonymical catalogue Passeres-Grallae)
 Baker, Stuart (1930) Birds. 8. 326 p (Synonymical catalogue Grallae - Pygopodes; Corrigenda and Addenda)

Mammals
 Blanford, WT (1888, 1891) Mammalia
 Part 1 Primates, Carnivora, Insectivora
 Part 2 Chiroptera, Rodentia, Ungulata, Cetacea, Sirenia, Edentata
Second edition
 Pocock, R.I. (1939) Mammalia. I. Primates and Carnivora
 Pocock, R.I. (1941) Mammalia. II. Carnivora :Aeluroidea, Arctoidea
 Ellerman, J.R, Roonwal, M.L. (ed.) (1961) Mammalia. III. Rodentia

References

External links

 Fauna of British India and Fauna of India - scanned volumes

Series of books
Natural history books
Natural history of India
Books on Lepidoptera